The following are stats for the Kansas City Wizards' 2001 season. The 2001 MLS season was cut short as a result of the terrorist attacks of 9/11.

Squad

Competitions

Major League Soccer

U.S. Open Cup

MLS Cup Playoffs

Copa Merconorte

Squad statistics

Final Statistics

References

Sporting Kansas City seasons
Kansas City Wizards
Kansas City Wizards